Gilles Cantagrel (born 20 November 1937) is a French musicologist, writer, lecturer and music educator.

Biography 
Born in Paris, Cantagrel studied physics, art history and music at the École Normale de Musique de Paris and at the Conservatoire de Paris. He also practices organ and choral conducting. Since 1965, he has been focusing on journalism and communication and writes in magazines such as Harmonie and Diapason.

He became a producer of radio programs in France and abroad and directed the programmes of France Musique between 1984 and 1987. Artistic advisor to the director of France Musique, he was vice-president of the musical commission of the European Broadcasting Union.

He is the author of a series of films on the history of the pipe organ in Europe (4 DVDs). A teacher, lecturer, and animator, he took part in 1985 in the creation of the classical music fair "Musicora".

He was president of the "Association des grandes orgues" of Chartres from 2003 to 2008. He is a director of institutions such as the Centre de musique baroque de Versailles, and member of the Supervisory Board of the Bach Foundation in Leipzig.

In 2001, he was appointed member of the High Committee on National Commemorations by the Minister of Culture.

He has been a lecturer at the Paris-Sorbonne University, lecturer at the Conservatoire de Paris and at various conservatories and universities in France, Switzerland and Canada. He lectures in Europe in North America and participates in international competition juries.

He is chevalier de la Légion d'honneur, commandeur des Arts et Lettres, cross of the Order of Merit of the Federal Republic of Germany and holder of the golden distinction of the province of Vienna (Austria). In 2006, he was elected a correspondent of the Académie des Beaux-Arts.

A renowned expert of Leipzig's cantor and his time, he regularly participates in many festivals in France, Switzerland and Quebec.

Publications

Works 
 
 Guide pratique du discophile (Paris, 1978)
 Dictionnaire des disques (Paris, 1981)
 Bach en son temps (Paris, 1982), new edition, reworked and expanded in 1997 ,
 Guide de la musique d'orgue (Paris, Fayard, 1991); edition, reworked and expanded in November 2012.
 The Orchestre national de France (with Claudette Douay), Tours, 1994,
 Guide de la mélodie et du lied (dir. with Brigitte François-Sappey), Paris, 1994 ,
 Bach pédagogue, Marsyas (Paris, 1996)
  (À partir de l'analyse des œuvres et des textes, des documents historiques, des traités musicaux, de la théologie, de la rhétorique, etc. (Grand Prix de littérature musicale de l'Académie Charles-Cros, Prix Catenacci de l'Académie des Beaux-Arts).)
 Passion Bach, l'album d'une vie (Paris, 2000), évocation du temps, de la vie et de la création de Jean-Sébastien Bach à la lumière de l'iconographie du XVIIIe
 Bach, Ars oratoria, Bach Pilgrimage (London, 2000)
 Unter dem Zeichen des Wassers, Triangel (Leipzig, 2000)
 Tempérament, Tonalités, Affects. Un exemple : si mineur, Ostinato Rigore (Paris, 2001)
 Musica e gola, Enciclopedia della Musica (Turin, 2002) - French edition Paris, 2004 
 Georg Philipp Telemann ou le Célèbre Inconnu  (Geneva, 2003-2005), first book in French about this composer 
 La Rencontre de Lübeck, Bach and Buxtehude (Paris, 2003)  New edition Paris, 2015
 Les plus beaux manuscrits de la musique classique on Babelio (Paris, 2003) 
 Le Baroque et le Signe (Lyon, 2004)
 Les plus beaux manuscrits de Mozart (Paris, 2005) 
 L'Europe du Baroque, ou le Concert des Nations (Paris, 2005)
 Mozart, Don Giovanni, le manuscrit (prix des Muses, Musicora), Paris, 2005 
 Buxtehude et la musique en Allemagne du Nord dans la seconde moitié du XVIIe on WorldCat Paris, 2006 (prize René Dumesnil of the Académie des Beaux Arts, prize SACEM/Deauville de la biographie musicale et prix du Syndicat professionnel de la critique de théâtre, de musique et de danse) 
 Mozart (Paris, Académie des Beaux Arts, 2007)
 De Schütz à Bach. La musique du baroque en Allemagne (Fayard, 2008)  
 J.S. Bach, de l'angoisse à la création (Paris, Académie de médecine, 2009)
 Les Cantates de Jean-Sébastien Bach (Fayard, 2010) 
 J. S. Bach, Passions, Messes et Motets (Fayard, 2011) 
 Bach, la Chair et l'Esprit, CD Book with 6 CD (Paris, Alpha, 2011),
 Mozart. Le Quintette en ré majeur (Paris, 2013),
 Carl Philipp Emanuel Bach et l’âge de la sensibilité (Geneva, 2013).
 Passion Baroque (Fayard, 2015) 
 L'émotion musicale à l'âge baroque (Paris, Éditions du Seuil, 2016).

Direction or participation in collective publications 
 Larousse de la musique,
 Dictionnaire des auteurs,
 Dictionnaire des œuvres,
 Encyclopaedia universalis,
 Grove Dictionary of musicians.

References

External links 

 Gilles Cantagrel on France Culture
 Gilles Cantagrel on Fayard
 Gilles Cantagrel on Canal Académie
 Gilles Cantagrel on France Inter
 Conférence Mozart, de Lumière et de Savoir prononcée le 26 octobre 2006 à la Grande Bibliothèque, Bibliothèque et Archives nationales du Québec
 Passion Bach par Lucie Renaud,

20th-century French musicologists
21st-century French musicologists
20th-century French non-fiction writers
21st-century French non-fiction writers
Conservatoire de Paris alumni
École Normale de Musique de Paris alumni
Pipe organ
Chevaliers of the Légion d'honneur
Commandeurs of the Ordre des Arts et des Lettres
Recipients of the Cross of the Order of Merit of the Federal Republic of Germany
1937 births
Writers from Paris
Living people
Academic staff of the Conservatoire de Paris